Bishnoi (also known as Vishnoi) is a community found in the Western Thar Desert and northern states of India. They follow a set of 29 principles/commandments given by Guru Jambheshwar (also known as Guru Jambhoji, Guru Jambha) (1451-1536). They are a sub-sect of the Vaishnav Sampraday. As of 2019, there are an estimated 600,000 followers of Bishnoi Panth residing in north and central India. Shree Guru Jambheshwar founded the sect at Samrathal Dhora in 1485 and his teachings, comprising 120 shabads, are known as Shabadwani. He preached for the next 51 years, travelling across India. The preaching of Guru Jambhoji inspires his followers as well as environmental protectors. Bishnoi sect admitted members from a variety of castes including Jats, Bania, Charans, Rajputs, and Brahmins.

History
Bishnoi Panth was founded by Shree Guru Jambheshwar (1451-1536), also known as Jambhoji. Some people have used the term Vishnoi, meaning followers of Vishan(Vishnu's name in local dialect), while most refer to themselves as Bishnoi. Adherents are also known as Jambeshwarpanthi because of their devotion to their Guru; Jambeshwar.

Shree Guru Jambeshwar announced a set of 29 tenets. These were contained in a document called Shabadwani, written in the Nagri script, which consists of 120 shabads. Of his 29 tenets, ten are directed towards personal hygiene and maintaining good basic health, seven for healthy social behaviour, and four tenets to the worship of God. Eight tenets have been prescribed to preserve bio-diversity and encourage good animal husbandry. These include a ban on killing animals and cutting green trees, and providing protection to all life forms. The community is also directed to see that the firewood they use is devoid of small insects. Wearing blue clothes is prohibited because the dye for colouring them is obtained by cutting a large quantity of shrubs.

29 rules or principles
The 29 principles of Bishnois are as follows:
 Observe a 30-day state of ritual impurity after childbirth, and keep the mother and child away from household activities.
 Observe five-day segregation from households activities such as cooking food, serving water, etc. while a woman is in her menses.
 Bathe daily in the morning before sunrise.
 Obey the ideal rules of life: Modesty, patience, or satisfactions, cleanliness.
 Pray twice every day (morning and evening).
 Eulogize God, Vishnu, in the evening (Aarti)
 Perform Yajna (Havan) with the feelings of welfare, devotion and love.
 Use filtered water, milk, and cleaned firewood or use cooking fuel after removing living organisms around it.
 Speak pure words in all sincerity.
 Practice forgiveness and kindness from the heart.
 Be merciful with sincerity.
 Do not steal nor harbour any intention to do it.
 Do not condemn or criticize.
 Do not lie.
 Do not indulge in disputes or conflicts.
 Fast on Amavasya.
 Worship and recite the name of Lord Vishnu in adoration.
 Be merciful to all living beings and love them.
 Do not cut green trees, save the environment.
 Keep away from lust, anger, greed, and attachment. Use one's strength for the right cause and fight for righteousness till the last breath. This will take one to heaven while living or after death.
 Cook one's own food and keep it pure from all surroundings.
 Provide shelters for abandoned animals to avoid them from being slaughtered in abattoirs.
 Do not sterilize bulls.
 Do not use or trade opium.
 Do not smoke or use tobacco or its products.
 Do not take bhang or hemp.
 Do not drink alcohol/liquor.
 Do not eat meat, always remain purely vegetarian.
 Do not wear blue attire of blue colour as this colour is extracted from the indigo plant.

Places of pilgrimage

The Bishnoi have various temples, of which they consider the holiest to be that in the village of Mukam in Nokha tehsil, Bikaner district, Rajasthan. .

Khejarli massacre

The Bishnoi narrate the story of Amrita Devi, a member of the sect who inspired as many as 363 other Bishnois to go to their deaths in protest of the cutting down of Khejri trees on 12 September 1730. The Maharaja of Jodhpur, Abhay Singh, requiring wood for the construction of a new palace, sent soldiers to cut trees in the village of Khejarli, which was called Jehnad at that time. Noticing their actions, Amrita Devi hugged a tree in an attempt to stop them. Her family then adopted the same strategy, as did other local people when the news spread. She told the soldiers that she considered their actions to be an insult to her faith and that she was prepared to die to save the trees. The soldiers did indeed kill her and others until Abhay Singh was informed of what was going on and intervened to stop the massacre.

Some of the 363 Bishnois who were killed protecting the trees were buried in Khejarli, where a simple grave with four pillars was erected. Every year, in September, i.e., Shukla Dashmi of Bhadrapad (Hindi month) the Bishnois assemble there to commemorate the sacrifice made by their people to preserve the trees.

See also

Chipko movement
Guru Jambeshwar University of Science and Technology
Guru Jambheshwar
Amrita Devi Bishnoi National Award

References

Further reading

 Jain, Pankaj (2011). Dharma and Ecology of Hindu Communities: Sustenance and Sustainability.
 

Social groups of Rajasthan
Indian surnames
Social groups of Haryana
Social groups of Uttar Pradesh
Social groups of Madhya Pradesh